Joseph Butore (born 1969) is a Burundian politician who served as Second Vice President of Burundi from 2015 to 2020. He was born in Cibitoke, Burundi in 1969. He was initially elected as a deputy of the Cibitoke constituency in 2010 and was appointed by President Pierre Nkurunziza as Minister of Higher Education and Scientific Research in 2013. In 2015, he was appointed Second Vice President.

On October 25, 2022, he received Russian citizenship.

References

1969 births
Living people
Burundian politicians
Vice-presidents of Burundi
National Council for the Defense of Democracy – Forces for the Defense of Democracy politicians